Big Timbers is a wooded riparian area in Colorado along both banks of the Arkansas River that is famous as a campsite for native American tribes and travelers on the Mountain Branch of the Santa Fe Trail.

Description
The Spanish knew this area as La Casa de Palo or the House of Wood, because wood was scarce along the banks of the Arkansas River except for that specific area. Cottonwood was the primary type of timber found there. It known by its Spanish name following Juan Bautista de Anza's defeat of Cuerno Verde and the parties signed a peace treaty there in 1785–1786. At its greatest extent, Big Timbers may have stretched from the mouth of the Purgatoire to the present-day Kansas-Colorado border, a distance of

Winter camping ground

Seasonally the Cheyenne that camped at Bent's Old Fort moved  down the Arkansas River from their camp to Big Timbers.  Alongside the Arkansas River for  Big Timbers was a prime location for hunting buffalo, a major source of food for the Cheyenne.  The tribe also lived on roots and berries. Big Timbers was their desired camp site in the winter, due to the relatively mild weather.

According to Hyde, William Bent's wife, Owl Woman and her children traveled with her tribe to Big Timbers during the winter months and were at the fort itself during the summer.  During the Cheyenne's winter visit to Big Timbers, Bent accompanied his family with goods for trading. At Big Timbers, Bent lived in accordance with Cheyenne customs which was a more casual, unstructured way of life.  His life at Bent's Fort was somewhat structured with William having a leadership role.

Trading
A favorite camping ground for the Cheyenne and Arapaho, William Bent located Bent's New Fort near Big Timbers and present-day Lamar to trade with the Native Americans. Alexander Barclay and William Tharp also traded at Big Timbers.

Notes

References

Geography of Prowers County, Colorado
Santa Fe Trail
Native American history of Colorado
Cheyenne tribe
Arapaho